The 2019–20 Cleveland Cavaliers season was the 50th season of the franchise in the National Basketball Association (NBA). The Cavaliers replaced Larry Drew, with former Michigan Wolverines men's basketball coach John Beilein on May 13.

On February 19, 2020, after beginning the season with a 14–40 record, Beilein resigned as head coach after only 54 games at the helm. J. B. Bickerstaff, who served as an assistant coach and associate head coach, was named head coach.

The season was suspended by the league officials following the games of March 11 after it was reported that Rudy Gobert of the Utah Jazz tested positive for COVID-19. On June 4, it was announced that the NBA had approved a return to play for 22 teams in the NBA Bubble. The Cavaliers, with the league's second-worst record at the time of the season's suspension, were not among them, effectively ending the team's season. The Cavaliers finished with a 19–46 record, which is the equivalent of a 24–58 record in a traditional 82-game season.

Draft

The Cavaliers held two first-round draft picks, including the fifth pick earned from the lottery. With the fifth pick of the draft, the Cavaliers selected point guard Darius Garland from Vanderbilt University.

Roster

Standings

Division

Conference

Game log

Preseason

|- style="background:#cfc"
| 1
| October 7
| San Lorenzo
| 
| Jordan Clarkson (17)
| Tristan Thompson (10)
| Cedi Osman (5)
| Rocket Mortgage FieldHouse9,902
| 1–0
|- style="background:#fcc"
| 2
| October 11
| @ Detroit
| 
| Collin Sexton (24)
| Larry Nance Jr. (11)
| Collin Sexton (4)
| Little Caesars Arena13,925
| 1–1
|- style="background:#fcc"
| 3
| October 13
| @ Boston
| 
| Sindarius Thornwell (12)
| Jarell Martin (9)
| Collin Sexton (3)
| TD Garden18,624
| 1–2
|- style="background:#fcc"
| 4
| October 15
| Boston
| 
| Collin Sexton (20)
| Jarell Martin (9)
| Matthew Dellavedova (5)
| Rocket Mortgage FieldHouse12,398
| 1–3

Regular season 

|- style="background:#fcc;"
| 1
| October 23
| @ Orlando
| 
| Thompson, Sexton (16)
| Kevin Love (18)
| Darius Garland (5)
| Amway Center18,846
| 0–1
|- style="background:#cfc;"
| 2
| October 26
| Indiana
| 
| Tristan Thompson (25)
| Thompson, Love (13)
| Kevin Love (9)
| Rocket Mortgage FieldHouse19,432
| 1–1
|- style="background:#fcc;"
| 3
| October 28
| @ Milwaukee
| 
| Collin Sexton (18)
| Kevin Love (16)
| Thompson, Clarkson (4)
| Fiserv Forum17,385
| 1–2
|- style="background:#cfc;"
| 4
| October 30
| Chicago
| 
| Tristan Thompson (23)
| Kevin Love (20)
| Kevin Love (6)
| Rocket Mortgage FieldHouse17,595
| 2–2

|- style="background:#fcc;"
| 5
| November 1
| @ Indiana
| 
| Kevin Love (22)
| Kevin Love (17)
| Jordan Clarkson (5)
| Bankers Life Fieldhouse16,079
| 2–3
|- style="background:#fcc;"
| 6
| November 3
| Dallas
| 
| Kevin Love (29)
| Tristan Thompson (12)
| Brandon Knight (6)
| Rocket Mortgage FieldHouse18,078
| 2–4
|- style="background:#fcc;"
| 7
| November 5
| Boston
| 
| Collin Sexton (21)
| Tristan Thompson (13)
| Thompson, Clarkson (4)
| Rocket Mortgage FieldHouse17,709
| 2–5
|- style="background:#cfc;"
| 8
| November 8
| @ Washington
| 
| Tristan Thompson (21)
| Love, Thompson (12)
| Darius Garland (6)
| Capital One Arena16,946
| 3–5
|- style="background:#cfc;"
| 9
| November 10
| @ New York
| 
| Collin Sexton (31)
| Nance Jr., Thompson (9)
| Darius Garland (6)
| Madison Square Garden19,812
| 4–5
|- style="background:#fcc;"
| 10
| November 12
| @ Philadelphia
| 
| Love, Clarkson (20)
| Tristan Thompson (12)
| Collin Sexton (4)
| Wells Fargo Center20,294
| 4–6
|- style="background:#fcc;"
| 11
| November 14
| Miami
| 
| Kevin Love (21)
| Kevin Love (10)
| Porter Jr., Dellavedova (4)
| Rocket Mortgage FieldHouse17,374
| 4–7
|- style="background:#fcc;"
| 12
| November 17
| Philadelphia
| 
| Collin Sexton (17)
| Tristan Thompson (9)
| Thompson, Clarkson (3)
| Rocket Mortgage FieldHouse19,432
| 4–8
|- style="background:#fcc;"
| 13
| November 18
| @ New York
| 
| Kevin Porter Jr. (18)
| Cedi Osman (8)
| Jordan Clarkson (4)
| Madison Square Garden17,097
| 4–9
|- style="background:#fcc;"
| 14
| November 20
| @ Miami
| 
| Kevin Love (25)
| Kevin Love (13)
| Matthew Dellavedova (5)
| American Airlines Arena19,600
| 4–10
|- style="background:#fcc;"
| 15
| November 22
| @ Dallas
| 
| Darius Garland (23)
| Tristan Thompson (8)
| Collin Sexton (5)
| American Airlines Center19,639
| 4–11
|- style="background:#cfc;"
| 16
| November 23
| Portland
| 
| Jordan Clarkson (28)
| Osman, Nance Jr. (12)
| Cedi Osman (5)
| Rocket Mortgage FieldHouse19,432
| 5–11
|- style="background:#fcc;"
| 17
| November 25
| Brooklyn
| 
| Jordan Clarkson (23)
| Larry Nance Jr. (13)
| Kevin Porter Jr. (7)
| Rocket Mortgage FieldHouse17,143
| 5–12
|- style="background:#fcc;"
| 18
| November 27
| Orlando
| 
| Collin Sexton (20)
| Tristan Thompson (15)
| Collin Sexton (6)
| Rocket Mortgage FieldHouse17,712
| 5–13
|- style="background:#fcc;"
| 19
| November 29
| Milwaukee
| 
| Darius Garland (21)
| Tristan Thompson (13)
| Kevin Love (7)
| Rocket Mortgage FieldHouse19,432
| 5–14

|- style="background:#fcc;"
| 20
| December 3
| Detroit
| 
| Collin Sexton (22)
| Tristan Thompson (14)
| Larry Nance Jr. (5)
| Rocket Mortgage FieldHouse17,504
| 5–15
|- style="background:#fcc;"
| 21
| December 6
| Orlando
| 
| Collin Sexton (19)
| Larry Nance Jr. (11)
| Tristan Thompson (5)
| Rocket Mortgage FieldHouse18,446
| 5–16
|- style="background:#fcc;"
| 22
| December 7
| @ Philadelphia
| 
| Darius Garland (17)
| Kevin Love (7)
| Thompson, Porter Jr. (4)
| Wells Fargo Center20,844
| 5–17
|- style="background:#fcc;"
| 23
| December 9
| @ Boston
| 
| Jordan Clarkson (19)
| Tristan Thompson (11)
| Matthew Dellavedova (4)
| TD Garden19,156
| 5–18
|- style="background:#fcc;"
| 24
| December 11
| Houston
| 
| Kevin Porter Jr. (24)
| Kevin Love (11)
| Cedi Osman (7)
| Rocket Mortgage FieldHouse17,122
| 5–19
|- style="background:#cfc;"
| 25
| December 12
| @ San Antonio
| 
| Kevin Love (30)
| Kevin Love (17)
| Darius Garland (5)
| AT&T Center18,354
| 6–19
|- style="background:#fcc;"
| 26
| December 14
| @ Milwaukee
| 
| Kevin Porter Jr. (15)
| Kevin Love (10)
| Darius Garland (5)
| Fiserv Forum17,481
| 6–20
|- style="background:#fcc;"
| 27
| December 16
| @ Toronto
| 
| Collin Sexton (25)
| Tristan Thompson (8)
| Garland, Henson (5) 
| Scotiabank Arena19,800
| 6–21
|- style="background:#cfc;"
| 28
| December 18
| Charlotte
| 
| Collin Sexton (23)
| Kevin Love (14)
| Kevin Love (7)
| Rocket Mortgage FieldHouse17,023
| 7–21
|- style="background:#cfc;"
| 29
| December 20
| Memphis
| 
| Jordan Clarkson (33)
| Tristan Thompson (15)
| Matthew Dellavedova (8)
| Rocket Mortgage FieldHouse19,432
| 8–21
|- style="background:#cfc;"
| 30
| December 23
| Atlanta
| 
| Collin Sexton (25)
| Tristan Thompson (10)
| Kevin Love (5)
| Rocket Mortgage FieldHouse18,007
| 9–21
|- style="background:#fcc;"
| 31
| December 27
| @ Boston
| 
| Kevin Love (30)
| Thompson, Love (7)
| Matthew Dellavedova (6)
| TD Garden19,156
| 9–22
|- style="background:#cfc;"
| 32
| December 28
| @ Minnesota
| 
| Garland, Sexton (18)
| Tristan Thompson (15)
| Garland, Thompson (3)
| Target Center15,411
| 10–22
|- style="background:#fcc;"
| 33
| December 31
| @ Toronto
| 
| Collin Sexton (22)
| Thompson, Love (11)
| Garland, Osman, Porter Jr. (4)
| Scotiabank Arena19,800
| 10–23

|- style="background:#fcc;"
| 34
| January 2
| Charlotte
| 
| Collin Sexton (21)
| Tristan Thompson (11)
| Darius Garland (8)
| Rocket Mortgage FieldHouse17,859
| 10–24
|- style="background:#fcc;"
| 35
| January 4
| Oklahoma City
| 
| Collin Sexton (30)
| Tristan Thompson (14)
| Darius Garland (7)
| Rocket Mortgage FieldHouse19,432
| 10–25
|- style="background:#fcc;"
| 36
| January 5
| Minnesota
| 
| Dante Exum (28)
| Ante Žižić (12)
| Knight, Henson (3) 
| Rocket Mortgage FieldHouse16,159
| 10–26
|- style="background:#fcc;"
| 37
| January 7
| Detroit
| 
| Kevin Love (30)
| Tristan Thompson (15)
| Matthew Dellavedova (9)
| Rocket Mortgage FieldHouse17,274
| 10–27
|- style="background:#cfc;"
| 38
| January 9
| @ Detroit
| 
| Tristan Thompson (35)
| Tristan Thompson (14)
| Darius Garland (7)
| Little Caesars Arena13,445
| 11–27
|- style="background:#cfc;"
| 39
| January 11
| @ Denver
| 
| Collin Sexton (25)
| Kevin Love (15)
| Darius Garland (8)
| Pepsi Center19,533
| 12–27
|- style="background:#fcc;"
| 40
| January 13
| @ L. A. Lakers
| 
| Kevin Love (21)
| Kevin Love (11)
| Garland, Sexton (4)
| Staples Center18,997
| 12–28
|- style="background:#fcc;"
| 41
| January 14
| @ L. A. Clippers
| 
| Collin Sexton (25)
| Thompson, Wade (8)
| Darius Garland (10)
| Staples Center19,068
| 12–29
|- style="background:#fcc;"
| 42
| January 17
| @ Memphis
| 
| Collin Sexton (28)
| Alfonzo McKinnie (10)
| Garland, Sexton (6)
| FedExForum17,102
| 12–30
|- style="background:#fcc;"
| 43
| January 18
| @ Chicago
| 
| Kevin Love (29)
| Tristan Thompson (8)
| Kevin Love (6)
| United Center19,939
| 12–31
|- style="background:#fcc;"
| 44
| January 20
| New York
| 
| Collin Sexton (17)
| Tristan Thompson (22)
| Collin Sexton (4)
| Rocket Mortgage FieldHouse17,133
| 12–32
|- style="background:#fcc;"
| 45
| January 23
| Washington
| 
| Collin Sexton (29)
| Larry Nance Jr. (12)
| Cedi Osman (5)
| Rocket Mortgage FieldHouse16,689
| 12–33
|- style="background:#fcc;"
| 46
| January 25
| Chicago
| 
| Kevin Love (20)
| Love, Nance Jr. (11)
| Thompson, Osman (6)
| Rocket Mortgage FieldHouse19,432
| 12–34
|- style="background:#cfc;"
| 47
| January 27
| @ Detroit
| 
| Collin Sexton (23)
| Tristan Thompson (11)
| Collin Sexton (5)
| Little Caesars Arena12,597
| 13–34
|- style="background:#fcc;"
| 48
| January 28
| New Orleans
| 
| Collin Sexton (24)
| Larry Nance Jr. (11)
| Larry Nance Jr. (7)
| Rocket Mortgage FieldHouse19,432
| 13–35
|- style="background:#fcc;"
| 49
| January 30
| Toronto
| 
| Love, Sexton (23)
| Tristan Thompson (12)
| Darius Garland (8)
| Rocket Mortgage FieldHouse17,695
| 13–36

|- style="background:#fcc;"
| 50
| February 1
| Golden State
| 
| Collin Sexton (23)
| Love, Thompson (11)
| Kevin Love (5)
| Rocket Mortgage FieldHouse18,410
| 13–37
|- style="background:#fcc;"
| 51
| February 3
| New York
| 
| Kevin Love (33)
| Kevin Love (13)
| Collin Sexton (7)
| Rocket Mortgage FieldHouse16,303
| 13–38
|- style="background:#fcc;"
| 52
| February 5
| @ Oklahoma City
| 
| Collin Sexton (23)
| John Henson (11)
| Darius Garland (6)
| Chesapeake Energy Arena18,203
| 13–39
|- style="background:#fcc;"
| 53
| February 9
| L. A. Clippers
| 
| Andre Drummond (19)
| Andre Drummond (14)
| Darius Garland (6)
| Rocket Mortgage FieldHouse17,240
| 13–40
|- style="background:#cfc;"
| 54
| February 12
| Atlanta
| 
| Tristan Thompson (27)
| Andre Drummond (15)
| Darius Garland (7)
| Rocket Mortgage FieldHouse16,200
| 14–40
|- style="background:#cfc;"
| 55
| February 21
| @ Washington
| 
| Collin Sexton (25)
| Andre Drummond (12)
| Garland, Thompson (4)
| Capital One Arena18,895
| 15–40
|- style="background:#fcc;"
| 56
| February 22
| @ Miami
| 
| Cedi Osman (19)
| Dante Exum (8)
| Collin Sexton (9)
| American Airlines Arena19,754
| 15–41
|- style="background:#cfc;"
| 57
| February 24
| Miami
| 
| Kevin Porter Jr. (30)
| Kevin Love (14)
| Darius Garland (7)
| Rocket Mortgage FieldHouse17,336
| 16–41
|- style="background:#cfc;"
| 58
| February 26
| Philadelphia
| 
| Collin Sexton (28)
| Larry Nance Jr. (15)
| Love, Porter Jr. (6)
| Rocket Mortgage FieldHouse16,332
| 17–41
|- style="background:#fcc;"
| 59
| February 28
| @ New Orleans
| 
| Collin Sexton (31)
| Kevin Love (7)
| Matthew Dellavedova (6)
| Smoothie King Center18,304
| 17–42
|- style="background:#fcc;"
| 60
| February 29
| Indiana
| 
| Andre Drummond (27)
| Andre Drummond (13)
| Kevin Love (7)
| Rocket Mortgage FieldHouse19,432
| 17–43

|- style="background:#fcc;"
| 61
| March 2
| Utah
| 
| Collin Sexton (32)
| Kevin Love (9)
| Matthew Dellavedova (9)
| Rocket Mortgage FieldHouse15,453
| 17–44
|- style="background:#fcc;"
| 62
| March 4
| Boston
| 
| Collin Sexton (41)
| Larry Nance Jr. (15)
| Collin Sexton (6)
| Rocket Mortgage FieldHouse16,897
| 17–45
|- style="background:#cfc;"
| 63
| March 7
| Denver
| 
| Kevin Love (27)
| Tristan Thompson (13)
| Matthew Dellavedova (14)
| Rocket Mortgage FieldHouse19,432
| 18–45
|- style="background:#cfc;"
| 64
| March 8
| San Antonio
| 
| Andre Drummond (28)
| Kevin Love (18)
| Matthew Dellavedova (11)
| Rocket Mortgage FieldHouse17,995
| 19–45
|- style="background:#fcc;"
| 65
| March 10
| @ Chicago
| 
| Collin Sexton (26)
| Kevin Love (8)
| Matthew Dellavedova (8)
| United Center17,837
| 19–46
 
|- style="background:#;"
| 66
| March 13
| @ Charlotte
| 
|
|
|
| Spectrum Center
|
|- style="background:#;"
| 67
| March 14
| @ Atlanta
| 
|
|
|
| State Farm Arena
|
|- style="background:#;"
| 68
| March 17
| @ Houston
| 
|
|
|
| Toyota Center
|
|- style="background:#;"
| 69
| March 19
| @ Orlando
| 
|
|
|
| Amway Center
|
|- style="background:#;"
| 70
| March 21
| @ Indiana
| 
|
|
|
| Bankers Life Fieldhouse
|
|- style="background:#;"
| 71
| March 24
| Sacramento
| 
|
|
|
| Rocket Mortgage FieldHouse
|
|- style="background:#;"
| 72
| March 26
| LA Lakers
| 
|
|
|
| Rocket Mortgage FieldHouse
|
|- style="background:#;"
| 73
| March 28
| @ Brooklyn
| 
|
|
|
| Barclays Center
|
|- style="background:#;"
| 74
| March 30
| Phoenix
| 
|
|
|
| Rocket Mortgage FieldHouse
|
|- style="background:#;"
| 75
| April 1
| @ Utah
| 
|
|
|
| Vivint Smart Home Arena
|
|- style="background:#;"
| 76
| April 3
| @ Phoenix
| 
|
|
|
| Talking Stick Resort Arena
|
|- style="background:#;"
| 77
| April 5
| @ Sacramento
| 
|
|
|
| Golden 1 Center
|
|- style="background:#;"
| 78
| April 7
| @ Portland
| 
|
|
|
| Moda Center
|
|- style="background:#;"
| 79
| April 8
| @ Golden State
| 
|
|
|
| Chase Center
|
|- style="background:#;"
| 80
| April 11
| Milwaukee
| 
|
|
|
| Rocket Mortgage FieldHouse
|
|- style="background:#;"
| 81
| April 13
| Brooklyn
| 
|
|
|
| Rocket Mortgage FieldHouse
|
|- style="background:#;"
| 82
| April 15
| @ Atlanta
| 
|
|
|
| State Farm Arena
|

Transactions

Trades

Free agency

Re-signed

Additions

Subtractions

References

Cleveland Cavaliers seasons
Cleveland Cavaliers
Cleveland Cavaliers